Buprestis subornata is a species of metallic wood-boring beetle in the family Buprestidae. It is found in North America.

Subspecies
These two subspecies belong to the species Buprestis subornata:
 Buprestis subornata punctiventris Casey
 Buprestis subornata subornata

References

Further reading

 
 
 

Buprestidae
Articles created by Qbugbot
Beetles described in 1860